Karen Akers (born October 13, 1945) is an American actress and singer, who has appeared on Broadway, and in cabaret and film.

Early life
Akers was born Karen Orth-Pallavicini in New York City on October 13, 1945. Her immigrant father, Heinnick Christian Orth-Pallavicini, was of Austrian and Swiss-Italian heritage. He was reportedly a member of the European nobility family Pallavicini who dropped his title when he came to America. Her American-born mother, Mary Louise (née Adams), a chaplain, had Russian, Norwegian, and French forebears on one side of her family and Scotch-Irish ones on the other. Her younger sister, Nicole Orth-Pallavicini, is also an actress. Another younger sister, Marie Orth-Pallavicini, is married to David Baker Cadman, a grandson of John Cadman, 1st Baron Cadman. Akers graduated from Manhattanville College.

Career
Akers honed her acting skills as an amateur performer, starting in the Arlington (Virginia) Players production of Jacques Brel is Alive and Well and Living in Paris.
Akers first appeared on Broadway in the original production of Nine, a musical directed by Tommy Tune and based on the Federico Fellini film 8½, as Luisa Contini, the wife of promiscuous film director Guido Contini (played by Raúl Juliá). The show opened May 9, 1982, and had a successful run of 732 performances, closing February 4, 1984. Akers won a Theatre World Award for her performance. She was one of three actresses in the show nominated for the Tony Award for Best Featured Actress in a Musical, with the award eventually going to fellow cast member Liliane Montevecchi.

Beginning in 1985, Akers appeared in such feature films as Woody Allen's The Purple Rose of Cairo (as a celluloid chanteuse), and in Heartburn (as the mistress of Jack Nicholson's character).

She appeared on Broadway in Grand Hotel, a musical adaptation of the novel and film, scored by Robert Wright, George Forrest, and Maury Yeston. In Grand Hotel Akers was reunited with Nine director Tommy Tune and Nine cast members Liliane Motevecchi and Kathi Moss. The show opened November 12, 1989, for a run of 1,018 performances, through April 19, 1992.

Akers covered "Sooner or Later" in her 1991 album Unchained Melodies, a song written for Madonna by Stephen Sondheim the year before.

Personal life
On September 19, 1993, Akers married Kevin Patrick Power, vice president of the satellite communications company Orion Network Systems, in a Roman Catholic ceremony at St. Paul's Chapel of Columbia University in New York.
 
It was her second marriage. She has two sons from her first marriage to Jim Akers in 1968, which ended in divorce.

Filmography

Film

Television

DVD Concert Films
 2005:  Karen Akers: On Stage at Wolf Trap

Partial discography
 1981: Presenting Karen Akers - Blackwood Records BLWD 001
 1982: Karen Akers - Rizzoli/Blackwood Records 1001
 1987: In A Very Unusual Way - Rizzoli Records 1004/71004
 reissue 1999 In A Very Unusual Way - Cabaret 5002
 1994: Just Imagine - DRG 5231
 1996: Under Paris Skies - Cabaret Records 5019
 1997: Live from Rainbow and Stars - DRG 1450
 2001: Feels Like Home - DRG 1465
 2004: If We Only Have Love - DRG 1383
 2006: Like It Was - DRG CD 91498
 2008: Simply Styne - DRG  1506

References

External links
Karen Akers website 

Karen Akers on e-music.com
Karen Akers article at Playbill

1945 births
Living people
American musical theatre actresses
Actresses from New York City
Schools of the Sacred Heart alumni
Manhattanville College alumni
20th-century American actresses
Cabaret singers
American film actresses
Singers from New York City
American contraltos
American people of Austrian descent
American people of Swiss-Italian descent
American people of Norwegian descent
American people of French descent
American people of Russian descent
American people of Scotch-Irish descent
American television actresses
American stage actresses
Nightclub performers
21st-century American women